Bernd Schneider (born 17 November 1973) is a German former footballer. He was mainly a midfielder but could play anywhere on the left and right flanks. After retiring in June 2009, he took up an advisory role at his first club, Carl Zeiss Jena, and a scouting position at Bayer Leverkusen.

Nicknamed Schnix by fans and teammates, Schneider started out at his hometown club Carl Zeiss Jena and made a name for himself during his decade-long stint at Bayer Leverkusen. He earned the nickname "The White Brazilian" for his dribbling and passing skills as well as his accurate free kicks and corners. Although mostly a provider of goals rather than a finisher, he was capable of scoring, especially from long distance. Schneider is notable for having multiple second and third place medals from national, continental and international tournaments (including the Bundesliga, UEFA Champions League and FIFA World Cup) without having ever having won a major tournament.

Club career
Schneider started his professional career at local Carl Zeiss Jena, going on to help the Thuringian outfit to stay five seasons in the second division; his debut came on 13 August 1991, playing close to ten minutes in a 1–3 loss at Darmstadt 98.

Schneider then played one season at Eintracht Frankfurt, subsequently moving to Bayer Leverkusen, and establishing himself as an essential player for both club and country. In 1999–2000 and
2001–02, he was instrumental in Bayer's runner-up league finishes, serving 11 decisive passes in the latter season, as well as netting five goals himself; he also appeared 19 times as the side reached the 2002 Champions League Final.

More a creator than a finisher, Schneider scored a career-best ten league goals in the 2003–04 season, making him the highest-scoring midfielder in that year's competition, alongside Johan Micoud; Leverkusen finished third and, during the following season, Schneider renewed his link for a further four years.

After two more seasons in which he scored ten goals and achieved 18 assists in 60 matches, Schneider began suffering consecutive injuries: first the calf, then the back, being sidelined almost the entire 2008–09 due to the latter. He only managed to return to action on 16 May 2009, playing the last 20 minutes of a 5–0 home win against Borussia Mönchengladbach. The following month, he announced his retirement after failing to fully recover from the injury.

On 29 May 2009, Carl Zeiss Jena named him as mentor to club president Peter Schreiber, and he began to work as scout for Bayer Leverkusen in June, immediately after retiring from play.

International career
Schneider made his debut for Germany during the 1999 Confederations Cup, playing in the 2–0 win against New Zealand and the loss to the United States (same result).

Since then, Schneider established himself as a vital squad member due to his work rate and versatility. He was ever-present at the 2002 World Cup, where he scored his first goal in their 8–0 thrashing of Saudi Arabia in the group stages, and at the Euro 2004. At the World Cup on home soil, along with Ballack, Torsten Frings and Bastian Schweinsteiger, they formed a formidable midfield and all played their part in the national team's unexpected success. He captained the team in their opening game against Costa Rica as Ballack was out injured. In the final group stage match, he was instrumental in Germany's 3–0 win over Ecuador which guaranteed them maximum points as group winners.

Schneider was ruled out of Germany's Euro 2008 squad, due to surgery to fix a slipped disc. He retired with 81 caps for Germany.

Personal life
Schneider and his wife Carina have one daughter, Emily and a son, Giovani.

Career statistics

Club

1.Includes Champions League and UEFA Cup.
2.Includes 2. Bundesliga playoff and German League Cup.

International
Source:

International goals
Scores and results table. Germany's goal tally first:

Honours
Bayer Leverkusen
 Bundesliga runner-up: 1999–2000, 2001–02
 DFB-Pokal runner-up: 2001–02, 2008–09
 UEFA Champions League runner-up: 2001–02

Germany
 FIFA World Cup runner-up: 2002, 3rd Place 2006
 FIFA Confederations Cup third place: 2005

Individual
 kicker Bundesliga Team of the Season: 2001–02, 2005–06
 UEFA Champions League top assist provider: 2001–02

References

External links

  
 
 
 
 Leverkusen who's who

1973 births
Living people
Sportspeople from Jena
People from Bezirk Gera
German footballers
Footballers from Thuringia
Association football midfielders
Bundesliga players
2. Bundesliga players
FC Carl Zeiss Jena players
Eintracht Frankfurt players
Bayer 04 Leverkusen players
Bayer 04 Leverkusen II players
Germany international footballers
Germany B international footballers
Germany youth international footballers
1999 FIFA Confederations Cup players
2002 FIFA World Cup players
UEFA Euro 2004 players
2005 FIFA Confederations Cup players
2006 FIFA World Cup players
East German footballers